St. Andrew's School (abbreviation: SA) is a family of schools in Singapore, affiliated to each other as well as to the Anglican Diocese of Singapore. It comprises St. Andrew's Junior School (SAJS), St. Andrew's Secondary School (SASS) and St. Andrew's Junior College (SAJC). The schools are often referred to as The Saints' Family.

Together, the three schools offer primary, secondary and pre-university education (otherwise known as Grades 1 to 12), having an enrolment of 4000 to 5000 students.

SAJS and SASS are located in the Woodsville Campus, while SAJC is located across the Kallang River in the Potong Pasir Campus. Both campuses are linked to each other by the Jacob Ballas Bridge, forming St Andrew's Village (SAV).

The junior and secondary schools have always only admitted male pupils, but female pupils were admitted to the pre-university or 'A' level classes when they were run from the senior school previously. St Andrew's Junior College has always been co-educational since being separated from the secondary school.

The school is also affiliated with other Anglican and Presbyterian schools in Singapore, including St Margaret's Primary School (St. Andrew's Sister School), St Margaret's Secondary School, St Hilda's Primary School, St Hilda's Secondary School, the Anglican High School, Presbyterian High School and Kuo Chuan Presbyterian Secondary School.

The name of the school is usually abbreviated as SA, or sometimes as SAS. Its pupils and alumni ('Old Boys' and 'Old Girls') are referred to as Saints. The alumni for all former students of St. Andrew's School is St. Andrew's Alumni, and was formed in 1921.

History

Chin Chew Street (1862–1863) 

SAS was founded on 8 September 1862 by Edward Sherman Venn through adopting a private institution owned by Sim Quee and Tye Kim in Chin Chew Street, in Singapore. The Anglican missionary led by Venn funded the school. Sim Quee and Tye Kim remained as headmasters of their school. This was unusual for the day as most missionary schools were not usually headed by Asians. The school was then known as the St Andrew's Church of England Mission School.

Upper Hokkien Street (1863–1872) 

On 10 September 1863, the school moved to Upper Hokkien Street because of the need for a better building and more space for the growing school. Soon after, Cheok Loy Fatt was appointed the headmaster.

After a couple of years, the school suffered from financial difficulties, and financial support was withdrawn in 1866. Venn died in 1866, which might explain why financial support was withdrawn at this time. In 1872, the colonial chaplain J.A. Beccles successfully applied to the government for financial aid. Thus, on 22 May 1872, St Andrew's School became a grant-in-aid institution.

Victoria Street (1872–1875) 

In 1872, Beccles was succeeded by George Frederick Hose as colonial chaplain. Meanwhile, the growing school moved to Victoria Street. Hose invited William Henry Gomes to act as school superintendent, in which the school prospered and grew.

During the early days at the Victoria Street site, both Hose and Gomes knew that the growth of the school would be hampered by poor accommodation. The government gave the school a  piece of land on the then Government Hill with a frontage on Stamford Road.

Stamford Road (1875–1940) 

The first building to go up was the chapel in 1875 and in that same year, the school vacated its cramped premises in Victoria Street and moved into the Stamford Road site. Classes were held in the chapel, which also became an important centre of public worship.

J. Romanis Lee, who became headmaster from 1912, was a benefactor of the school as it acquired many of its modern characteristics during his period as headmaster. He set about expanding the premises of the school and raised the status of the school from a second grade school to top grade in 1914, in which the school started to offer the Senior Cambridge Examination. He also established a tradition of sports in the school; the school excelled in boxing and rugby union.

Joseph Lee became headmaster in 1924 and the enrolment increased to 800. Lee established John Oxenham's poem "Up and On" as the school song. The first issue of the school magazine, "Up and On", made its appearance in 1928.

Reginald Keith Sorby Adams succeeded Lee as the next headmaster on 1 October 1934. By that time, St Andrew's had become well known for its boxing and rugby. The need for a bigger area than the cramped site at Stamford Road had become a problem by the early 1930s. There were scarcely enough classrooms and there was no playing field for a school which showed so much enthusiasm and aptitude for outdoor games.

This site ultimately became the site of the National Library of Singapore from 1960, before it moved to Victoria Street.

Pre-war Woodsville (1940–1942) 

In 1938, Woodsville Estate comprising  of land, was purchased for $60,000. Adams, assisted by archdeacon Graham White, played a major role in the moving of the school to the Woodsville site, after previously rejecting two sites in Tanjong Katong and on Serangoon Road. The two-storey school buildings were completed and officially opened by S. W. Jones, the officer administering the government, on 29 July 1940. The start of World War II in Singapore had the school closed.

Post-war Woodsville (1945–1990) 

Immediately after the war, the school was the first to re-open. The school was then divided into lower school and upper school. Until the arrival of Adams, who had just been released from internment, D.D. Chelliah acted as headmaster. As the school population grew, the school grew as well with the addition of another floor in 1952. The Lim Teck Kin Tower was also added in that year.

In 1955, the lower school was renamed the Junior School, and the upper school was renamed Secondary School. In 1956, due to the rapid growth of the junior school, it was further separated into two schools: Junior I and Junior II. Each junior school was run by its own headmaster, but this changed from 1960 onwards when both schools shared the same head.

In 1969, pre-university classes started and in 1978, St Andrew's Junior College was established and moved to Malan Road. By the 1980s, the Woodsville site was unable to handle the growth of both junior schools and the secondary school. Meanwhile, with nearby Potong Pasir developed, the school requested that a 4.18-hectare site allocated for education would be used for the St Andrew's Secondary School. Construction of the secondary school started on 3 November 1984 and the buildings were opened in July 1986.

1990-present 

In 1990, the two junior schools were combined into one school: St Andrew's Junior School. In 1996, the school had to relocate due to noise pollution from the recently upgraded Pan-Island Expressway. The school was relocated in January 1996 and the new school building was declared open by the then Minister for Education, Teo Chee Hean, in 1997.

As part of the St Andrew's Village project, all three schools were planned to return to Woodsville and Potong Pasir. Renovation and expansion of the junior school started in 2003, and the new buildings opened in December 2004. Construction of a new secondary school started in 2003, opposite the junior school along Francis Thomas Drive, and opened in December 2004. Construction of the junior college started in June 2003 after the secondary school vacated the site and shifted to its holding location. The junior college opened in December 2005 and a ceremony was held to mark its return to Woodsville/Potong Pasir. The village was officially opened on 26 August 2006, with the ceremony being held at the 1000-seater Cultural Centre in the junior college.

In addition to these three schools, the village also houses the diocesan office, the Ascension Kindergarten and three church buildings: the Chapel of the Resurrection, Chapel of the Holy Spirit and Church of Ascension. Some of the new facilities at the village include an Olympic size swimming pool, a 1,000-seat performing arts centre (Cultural Centre), air-conditioned school halls, gymnasiums, indoor basketball court, roof-top basketball court, tennis courts, cafe, rockwall, astro-turf artificial field and a sheltered bridge across the Kallang River to connect the junior and secondary schools to the junior college across the river. In 2010, piling work began for the construction of St Andrew's Hall, a 12-storey hostel with sufficient rooms to accommodate up to 600 students with facilities including a dining room for 600 people, an adjoining multipurpose hall as well as a clinic to serve the residents of the hall and St Andrew's Village. St Andrew's Hall was officially opened on 25 August 2012.

Construction for a new combined indoor sports hall at the existing site of the secondary school canteen block commenced in November 2016 with target for completion by end 2018. The new double size indoor sports hall block includes a new canteen for the secondary school. The junior school also commenced the PERI upgrading in the same period which will see construction above the current library as well as a new block at the end of the quadrangle facing the junior college.

There are also currently plans to redevelop the old science block which used to house the pre-university classes and currently houses Ascension Kindergarten. The redevelopment plans will include a new student leadership centre. The redevelopment plan is expected to be executed upon the completion of the indoor sports hall and PERI upgrading.

Principals

St Andrew's School (St Andrew's Secondary School) 

 1st Principal (1862 - 1863): Mr Sim Quee
 2nd Principal (1864 - 1887): Mr Cheok Loy Fatt
 3rd Principal (1888 - 1910): Mr D S Ponniah
 4th Principal (1911 - 1920): Mr James Romanis Lee
 5th Principal (1921): Mr P L Dickson
 6th Principal (1922 - 1923): Mr V Clough
 7th Principal (1924 - 1933): Mr Joseph Lee
 8th Principal (1934 - 1955): Mr R K S Adams
 9th Principal (1956 - 1963): Mr Tan Lye Whatt
 10th Principal (1964 - 1974): Mr Francis Thomas
 11th Principal (1974 - 1976): Mr C D Jansen
 Acting Principal (1976): Mr Ong Soo Kiong
 12th Principal (1977 - 1994): Mr Harry Tan
 Acting Principal (1994): Mrs Priscilla Krempl
 13th Principal (1995 - 2001): Mrs Priscilla Krempl
 14th Principal (2002 - 2010): Mrs Belinda Charles
 15th Principal (2011 - 2016): Mrs Lucy Toh
 16th Principal (2017 - 2020): Mrs Marion Tan
 17th Principal (2021 - Present): Mr Lee Han Hwa

St Andrew's Junior School 
 Principal (1950 - 1954): Mr Dong Chiu Sing
 Acting Principal (1954-1955): Miss L. Beeston
 Principal, Junior I (1956 - 1960): Mr Goh Soo Toon
 Principal, Junior II (1956 - 1958): Mr Kiong Woon Kew
 Principal, Junior II (1958 - 1960): Mr S.K. Bandara
 Acting Principal, Junior II (1960): Mr G.D. Champion
 Principal (1960 - 1964): Mr Goh Soon Toon
 Principal (1964 - 1980): Mr Quahe Beng Chuan
 Principal (1981 - 1984): Mr Chin Wai Fah
 Principal (1985 - 1986): Mr Tan Cheng Lim
 Principal (1986 - 1989): Mr Phua Eng Hee
 Principal (1990 - 1997): Mdm Jacqueline Oehlers
 Principal (1998 - 2003): Miss Poh Chwee Sian
 Principal (2004 - 2010): Mrs Wai Yin Pryke
 Principal (2011 - 2016): Mrs Wong Bin Eng
 Principal (2017 - 2022): Ms Patsy Neo
 Principal (2023 - Present): Mrs Elsie Poey

St Andrew's Junior College 

 1st Principal (1978 - 1990): Revd John Tan Teng Wai
 2nd Principal (1990 - 2001): Mrs Belinda Charles
 3rd Principal (2002 - 2007): Mrs Lim Chye Tin
 4th Principal (2008 - 2015): Mrs Lee Bee Yann
 5th Principal (2016 - 2020): Mr Mark Lo
 6th Principal (2021 - Present): Mr Tham Kine Thong

Culture

Saints' spirit 
The students of the school are encouraged to support the school sports teams. Particularly during semifinals and finals matches, the entire school is usually in full force at the venue to support the school team, wearing their widely recognised blue and white hoops. Cheering is led by the prefectorial board and the student government.

The school's rugby team also has its own battle cry, which is called the Saints' battle cry. It is normally mistaken by people as the haka. It is usually performed before the start of the match at a final or at special events.

The Saints' spirit also permeated into music producing members of such recording artists as The Sundowners, Tornados, Wes Cossacks, Straydogs, and Electrons with Rex Goh Tee Huat. The latter went on to join Australia's Air Supply.

Sports 
The school has been famous since the 1930s, and in 1962, 1963, 1964, 1965 and 1966 concurrently, under the dedicated tutelage of Mr Keong Snr, it rose to a new high with its boxing and rugby dominance over Singapore Boy's Town, Anglo-Chinese School, and Raffles Institution. Since the 1970s, the school has won the national championships consistently. The 1990s saw competition from Anglo-Chinese School (Independent) and Raffles Institution, but St Andrew's has had a major revival in the sport in recent years.

The school also excels in cricket and hockey.
Under the guidance of the cricket master Philip Ng, the school's cricket team saw success from 1998 onwards, with eight of its eleven players being called up for national under-15 representations in their first year of the game.
The rivalry between Raffles Institution and St. Andrew's continued in the ovals as the teams battled for the championship titles over the next few years.

Houses 
The school has a house system aimed at intra-school sporting competitions. The school originally had eleven houses. Today, there are five houses throughout the school, from the junior school to the junior college. The five houses are named after important people in the school's history:
 Venn (black), after Edward Sherman Venn, who was founder of the school in 1862,
 Hose (blue), after George Frederick Hose, who was colonial chaplain in the 1860s,
 Loy Fatt (yellow), after Cheok Loy Fatt, who was headmaster in the 1870s,
 Gomes (red), after William Henry Gomes, who was school superintendent during the 1870s, and
 Romanis (green), after J. Romanis Lee, who was headmaster in the 1910s.

School song, hymn and crest 
The school song was introduced by Joseph Lee. The words of the song are from John Oxenham's poem Up and On. All three schools share the same school song, school hymn and school crest.

School song

Verse 1
Lives are in the making here,
Hearts are in the waking here,
Mighty undertaking here,
Up and On!

We are arming for the fight,
Pressing on with all our might,
Pluming wings for higher flight,
Up and On!

Chorus
Up Boys (Saints)! truest fame
Lies in high endeavour;
Play the game! keep the flame
Burning brightly ever!

Verse 2
Fair before us lies the way,
Time for work and time for play;
Fill the measure while we may,
Up and On!

Life and time will not delay,
Time is running fast away,
Life is now today; today;
Up and On!

Verse 3
Foes in plenty we shall meet,
Hearts courageous scorn defeat;
So we press with eager feet,
Up and On!

Ever onward to the fight,
Ever upward to the Light,
Ever true to GOD and RIGHT,
Up and On!

School hymn
Our Father, by whose servants,
Our School was built of old,
Whose hand has crowned Thy children,
With blessings manifold;
For Thy unfailing mercies,
Far strewn along our way,
With all who passed before us,
We praise Thy name today.

They reaped not where they laboured,
We reap what they have sown;
Our harvest may be garnered,
By ages yet unknown.
The days of old have dowered us
With gifts beyond all praise,
Our Father make us faithful
To serve the coming days.

Before us and beside us,
Still holden by Thy hand,
A cloud of unseen witness,
Our elder comrades stand;
One family unbroken,
We join in one acclaim;
One heart, one voice uplifting
To glorify Thy name.

School crest
The official heraldic description of the crest is: Azure, a saltire argent, in chief keys, in base a tiger's face. Simply, the crest is a blue shield, with a silver diagonal cross. In the top quarter are two keys, and in the lower quarter is a tiger's face.

The blue shield and silver diagonal cross is the St Andrew's Cross. The keys represent the Keys to Knowledge and Heaven, and the tiger's face is a local symbol of strength.

Schools

St Andrew's Junior School 
St Andrew's Junior School (SAJS) started off as the lower school of St Andrew's School after World War 2. After being renamed in 1956, the school was split into two schools, but were combined in 1990. The school later moved to a site in Potong Pasir because of noise pollution caused by the recently upgraded Pan-Island Expressway in 1996.

Following plans for the St Andrew's Village, the school moved into new buildings at the same Potong Pasir site in December 2004 at 2 Francis Thomas Drive, Singapore 359337.

St Andrew's Secondary School 

St Andrew's Secondary School (SASS) started as the upper school of St Andrew's School after World War 2. The school moved from the Woodsville site in July 1986 to its site in Potong Pasir across the Kallang River after the Woodsville buildings were deemed inadequate for the running of both the junior and senior classes. In mid-2003, the school shifted to the old Victoria School building at Kallang Bahru as a temporary holding site. As part of the St Andrew's Village project, the school has moved into new buildings beside SAJS since 2005 at 15 Francis Thomas Drive, Singapore 359342. The premises incorporates Woodsville House which was earmarked as a heritage building. Woodsville House used to be the residences of the principals of St Andrew's School and is now used as the offices for the head of Departments on the second floor and has a small heritage gallery on the ground floor.

St Andrew's Junior College 

St Andrew's Junior College (SAJC) started as pre-university classes in 1969 and in 1978, moved to its site at 2 Malan Road. The college started the new year in 1978 with a brand new image, including a College Anthem of its own. However, in 1993, the college adopted back the original St Andrew's School crest, motto, song and hymn. The college has since returned to Potong Pasir as of 2006 as part of the St Andrew's Village project. It is situated on the former SASS site at 55 Potong Pasir Avenue 1, Singapore 358389. A sheltered pedestrian bridge, named Jacob Ballas Bridge, connects the junior college to the junior school and secondary school across the Kallang River.

National Schools Games - championship titles

Rugby 
National Schools Under-20 A-Division (Since 1971): 1972, 1973, 1974, 1975, 1979, 1981, 1987, 1989, 2006 and 2013 
National Schools Under-17 B-Division (Since 1970): 1970, 1971, 1973, 1974, 1976, 1977, 1978, 1979, 1980, 1986, 1987, 1988, 1989, 1990, 1993, 2004, 2005, 2006, 2009, 2012, 2014 & 2018
National Schools Under-14 C-Division (Since 1970, 1974 unknown): 1970, 1971, 1972, 1976, 1978, 1979, 1980, 1981, 1986, 1987, 1990, 2013 and 2015
National Inter-Primary Schools Under-13 (Since 1996): 1996, 1997, 1998, 1999, 2000, 2001, 2003, 2004, 2006, 2007, 2008, 2009, 2011 and 2012
National Inter-Primary Schools Under-11 (Since 2005): 2005, 2006, 2007, 2008, 2011, 2012 and 2013

Cricket 
National Schools Under-20 A-Division: 2003 and 2004
National Schools Under-17 B-Division: 1996, 1997, 1998, 2001, 2002 and 2003
National Schools Under-14 C-Division: 1998, 1999 and 2002

Hockey 
National Schools Under-20 A-Division (Boys): 2010
National Schools Under-17 B-Division (Boys): 2005, 2008, 2016, 2019
National Schools Under-14 C-Division (Boys): 1996, 2010, 2012, 2014
National Inter-Primary Schools Under-13 (Boys): 2002, 2004, 2006, 2012, 2013
National Inter-Primary Schools Under-11 (Boys): 2000, 2003, 2004, 2011

Others 
National Schools Under-20 A-Division Basketball (Boys): 2002, 2004
National Schools Under-20 A-Division Bowling (Boys): 2002, 2005, 2006 and 2007
National Schools Under-20 A-Division Rhythmic Gymnastics (Girls): 2005
National Schools Under-20 A-Division Sailing (Boys): 2001
National Schools Under-20 A-Division VolleyBall (Girls): 2004
National Schools Under-14 C-Division Football (Boys): 1987
National Schools Under-20 A-Division Waterpolo (Girls): 2007
National Schools Under-17 B-Division Waterpolo: 1994, 1995
FAS Inter-JC Girls' Soccer Championship: 2005 and 2007

Citations in literature
 "Hearts Courageous: The Story Of St Andrew's School". Charles, Belinda (principal, St Andrew's Junior College 1990-2001). Landmark Books. 2001. ISBN 981-073-131-0.
 Poem: "Sungei Kallang Afternoons At St Andrew's School" by Koh Buck Song (O levels 1979), published in:
  - "The Worth Of Wonder" (poetry collection by Koh Buck Song, Times Editions, 2001). ISBN 981-232-180-2.
  - "Singapore: Places, Poems, Paintings" (book of poems and paintings about places in Singapore, Art & Artist Speak, 1993). ISBN 981-00-4559-X.

Notable alumni

Politics 
Elizabeth Choy: War heroine, Obtained the Order of British Empire
David Saul Marshall: Singapore's first chief minister, politician, diplomat, Singapore's most successful criminal lawyer
Benjamin Sheares: Singapore's second president
Eddie Teo: former permanent secretary – prime minister's Office, Singapore's ambassador
Fong Chong Pik (also known as "The Plen"): former leader of the Malayan Communist Party
J B Jeyaratnam: Opposition politician and former secretary-general of the Workers' Party. First opposition politician to be voted into Singapore's Parliament after independence, in the 1981 Anson constituency by-election.
Kenneth Jeyaretnam: Opposition politician. Secretary-general of the Reform Party of Singapore. Son of the late J.B. Jeyaretnam.
Paul Tambyah: Opposition politician. Chairman of the Singapore Democratic Party. 
 Noeleen Heyzer: executive secretary of the Economic and Social Commission for Asia and the Pacific; 1967 Pre U 2 Med
 S. Iswaran: minister for transport
 Michael Palmer: former speaker of Parliament

Law 
David Saul Marshall: criminal lawyer, diplomat, politician, Singapore's first chief minister
Joseph Grimberg: Singapore's Senior Counsel
Harry Elias: Singapore's Senior Counsel

Business 
Harry Elias: Singaporean lawyer, founder of Harry Elias and partners
Koh Boon Hwee: chairman – Yeo Hup Seng Group, chairman – DBS Group, chairman – Singapore Airlines, director – Temasek Holdings

Science, arts, education, journalism 
Kishore Mahbubani: dean of the National University of Singapore Lee Kuan Yew School of Public Policy, diplomat, former ambassador of Singapore to the United Nations, ex-president – United Nations Security Council
Colin Tan: Singapore poet, technology entrepreneur, founder of Rentlord
Leslie Charteris (Leslie Charles Bowyer Yin): British-American author and screenwriter ('The Saint (Simon Templar)', etc.)
Koh Buck Song: writer, journalist, author of Brand Singapore, business consultant, deputy chairman of Censorship Review Committee 2009–10.
Woffles Wu: plastic surgeon, present head of the St Andrew's Alumni Association
 Xian Xinghai: Chinese composer

Entertainment 
Nickson Fong: CEO and co-founder, Egg Story Creative Production Pte Ltd. FX technical director and shot development technical director of The Matrix and its sequels. First Singaporean to receive an Academy Award.
Stefanie Sun: Chinese pop singer
JJ Lin Jun Jie: Chinese pop singer and composer
Hong Junyang: Chinese pop singer, first male runner-up in MediaCorp Channel U Project Superstar 1 (Singapore)
Devarajan Varadarajan: 2nd runner in Mediacorp Vasantham Star (Singapore), starring in Mediacorp Vasantham drama serials and Mediacorp Channel 5's Point of Entry, Seasons 1, 2, 3 and 4. Winner – Highly Commended Best Supporting Actor, Asian Television Awards 2012.

Sports 
U.K. Shyam: current holder of Singapore's national 100 m sprint record at 10.37s. Singapore's national team.
 Indra Sahdan Daud: Singapore national football player
 Wilfred Skinner: former Singapore international football goalkeeper and field hockey centre-half.

References

Media mentions
Column on Elizabeth Choy – "She paid 40 cents for me to have this picture" by Koh, Buck Song (St Andrew's School 1970–79), The Straits Times 11 September 1995.

External links 

 Saint Andrew's Junior School (SAJS)
 Saint Andrew's Secondary School (SASS)
 Saint Andrew's Junior College (SAJC)
 Saint Andrew's Alumni (SAA) (formerly Saint Andrew's Old Boys' Association (SAOBA)

School groups in Singapore
Anglican schools in Singapore
Educational institutions established in 1862
Toa Payoh
1862 establishments in the British Empire